The 1924 Arizona Wildcats football team represented the University of Arizona as an independent during the 1924 college football season. In their tenth season under head coach Pop McKale, the Wildcats compiled a 2–4 record and were outscored by their opponents, 93 to 40. The team captain was Kirke LaShelle.

Schedule

References 

Arizona
Arizona Wildcats football seasons
Arizona Wildcats football